On 28 July 2019, a suicide car bombing occurred in the Kabul office of the Vice Presidential candidate Amrullah Saleh. The bombing killed over 20 and injured over 50, including slightly wounding Saleh. Four gunmen then stormed the building and laid siege for hours before being killed.

Casualties 
Twenty people were killed, and 50 others wounded, including Amrullah Saleh who was slightly injured in the blast.

Responsibility of the attack 
There was no immediate claim of responsibility for the attack but ISIL and the Taliban both frequently carry out attacks in this region.

See also  
 1 July 2019 Kabul attack
 List of terrorist attacks in Kabul

References 

28 July suicide bombing
2019 murders in Afghanistan
28 July 2019 suicide bombing
21st-century mass murder in Afghanistan
Attacks on buildings and structures in Kabul
Attacks on office buildings
Failed assassination attempts in Asia
July 2019 crimes in Asia
July 2019 events in Afghanistan
Mass murder in 2019
28 July 2019 suicide bombing
Suicide bombings in 2019
28 July 2019
Suicide car and truck bombings in Afghanistan
Terrorist incidents in Afghanistan in 2019
Building bombings in Afghanistan